The 2013 IRB Junior World Rugby Trophy was the sixth annual international rugby union competition for under-20 national teams, second-tier world championship.

The event was held in Temuco, Chile and was organized by rugby's governing body, the International Rugby Board. The tournament was originally to be held in Antofagasta, but that city pulled out of hosting only a few months before the tournament.

Teams

Pool Stage

Pool A 

{| class="wikitable" style="text-align: center;"
|-
!width="200"|Team
!width="20"|Pld
!width="20"|W
!width="20"|D
!width="20"|L
!width="20"|TF
!width="20"|PF
!width="20"|PA
!width="25"|PD
!width="20"|BP
!width="20"|Pts
|-
|align=left| 
| 3 || 3 || 0 || 0 || 21 || 144 ||26 || 118 || 3 || 15
|-
|align=left| 
| 3 || 2 || 0 || 1 || 4 || 47 || 77 || -30 || 0 || 8
|-
|align=left| 
| 3 || 1 || 0 || 2 || 5 || 45 || 96 || -51 || 0 || 4
|-
|align=left| 
| 3 || 0 || 0 || 3 || 7 || 45 || 82 || -37 || 1 || 1
|}

Fixtures

Pool B 

{| class="wikitable" style="text-align: center;"
|-
!width="200"|Team
!width="20"|Pld
!width="20"|W
!width="20"|D
!width="20"|L
!width="20"|TF
!width="20"|PF
!width="20"|PA
!width="25"|PD
!width="20"|BP
!width="20"|Pts
|-
|align=left| 
| 3 || 3 || 0 || 0 || 12 || 99 || 36 || 63 || 2 || 14
|-
|align=left| 
| 3 || 2 || 0 || 1 || 16 || 98 || 91 || 7 || 2 || 10
|-
|align=left| 
| 3 || 1 || 0 || 2 || 9 || 63 || 87 || -24 || 1 || 6
|-
|align=left| 
| 3 || 0 || 0 || 3 || 7 || 55 || 111 || -56 || 0 || 0
|}

Fixtures

Knockout stage

7th place game

5th place game

Third place game

Final

References

External links 

2013 rugby union tournaments for national teams
2013
2013 in Chilean sport
Sport in La Araucanía Region
International rugby union competitions hosted by Chile
2013 in youth sport